Henry Percy Gray (1869–1952) was an American painter.  Gray was born on October 3, 1869 into a San Francisco family with broad literary and artistic tastes.  He studied at the San Francisco School of Design and later under William Merritt Chase in New York.  While he had some early Impressionistic tendencies, his basic approach to composition and color was derived from the Barbizon School and Tonalism, which were emphasized at the School of Design.  He is primarily known for his romantic and lush depictions of the Northern California landscape.

Early years
Alexander Gray, Percy's father, was born in England and immigrated in 1867 with his Australian-born wife to San Francisco, where he became a successful insurance broker.  As the byproduct of a childhood illness, Percy realized he had talents in art. From 1886 to 1888 he attended the California School of Design and studied under Emil Carlsen, Virgil Williams, Thomas Hill, and Oscar Kunath.  His earliest documented exhibition was at the 1888 Mechanics’ Institute Fair where he displayed View of the Golden Gate.  From there he went on to become an assistant to a stockbroker and a quick-sketch illustrator for the San Francisco Morning Call before obtaining a job with the New York Journal.  In New York he studied at the Art Students League.  He was dispatched from New York to cover the 1906 San Francisco earthquake, but decided to remain in his native city where he would then take up his painting career.

A Painter in San Francisco
Gray's first pieces, headland seascapes, were exhibited in 1907 at the Sketch Club.  Gray “first rose to prominence” through the sketches he made for the Henry K. Thaw murder trial which were sensationally reproduced in all the Hearst newspapers.  From 1907 to 1914 his exhibited works at the San Francisco Art Association were primarily scenes of Berkeley and Alameda oaks, marshes, eucalyptus groves, seascapes, and fields of California wildflowers.  These subjects would become signatures of his work.  Originally Gray's works were oils; however, he eventually developed an allergy to oil paints, and switched to using watercolors as his primary medium.  From early on the critics marveled at his ability to infuse realistic depictions of nature with a mystical and poetic quality. He was clearly applying the precepts of his mentor William Merritt Chase in arranging light and color.

In 1909 he moved his residence from Alameda, California across the bay to Burlingame, California, which is about twenty miles south of San Francisco, where he maintained a studio.  He lived with his widowed mother and siblings.  For more than four decades he exhibited at museums and commercial galleries, some of which include the: Schussler Brothers Gallery of San Francisco (1909-1921); Rabjohn & Morcom Galleries of Oakland and San Francisco (1911-1920); Courvoisier Gallery of San Francisco (1911, 1931); Del Monte Art Gallery of Monterey (1907-1912, 1930); California Society of Etchers, San Francisco (1914); de Young Museum of San Francisco (1915-1916, 1925); Palace of Fine Arts in San Francisco (1916); St. Francis Hotel in San Francisco (1918, 1922); Stanford University, Palo Alto (1918, 1921); Print Rooms of San Francisco (1920-1921); Bohemian Club of San Francisco (1920-1949); Gump’s Galleries of San Francisco and Hawaii (1925-1926); Graves Gallery of San Francisco (1938-1939).  At the 1915 Panama-Pacific International Exposition he won a bronze medal for his watercolor Out of the Desert, Oregon.   He traveled outside of California, including paintings expeditions to the Pacific Northwest and Arizona.

Later years
Having been a bachelor for 53 years, Gray surprised his friends by marrying.  He and his bride, Leone Phelps, moved to Carmel-by-the-Sea, California in the spring of 1923 and later that year they purchased the Sherman Rose House on the grounds of the Larkin Adobe in nearby Monterey, California, where seascapes and cypress dominated his later works.  Gray was very active in the Carmel art colony, often staying for several months at a time, and exhibiting with the Carmel Arts and Crafts Club (1913, 1923) and the Carmel Art Association (1927-1928, 1932-1943).  In 1939 the Grays sold their adobe and moved to San Francisco.  Restless for the out-of-doors, Gray and his wife resettled in San Anselmo, California at the base of Mount Tamalpais in 1941.  He became a founding member of the conservative Society for Sanity in Art (later renamed the Society of Western Artists), where he exhibited from 1939 to 1947 and received several awards. After ten years in Marin County, California his wife died and he returned to San Francisco. Gray died on October 10, 1952 from a heart attack.

References

1869 births
1952 deaths
19th-century American painters
American male painters
20th-century American painters
Landscape artists
People from Burlingame, California
Artists from San Francisco
San Francisco Art Institute alumni
Tonalism
People from Monterey, California
19th-century American male artists
20th-century American male artists